"Poster Child" is a song by American rock band Red Hot Chili Peppers. It was released as a promotional single on March 4, 2022, taken from the band's twelfth studio album, Unlimited Love.

While not considered a proper single for radio airplay, the band released an animated music video for the song that was directed by Julien & Thami with the animation provided by  Julien Calemard, Thami Nabil and Hedi Nabil. The song was leaked online on March 3, 2022.

Composition
In contrast to the previous single "Black Summer," "Poster Child" exhibits a more funk rock sound. At NME, Alex Gallagher described the song as being "even more groove-heavy instrumental than usual."

Critical reception
Robin Murray at Clash Music gave the song a positive review, stating "'Poster Child' is the dream tune for Chili Pepper fans, both stylistically and lyrically encapsulating the funkadelic energy of the band whilst inviting listeners to reminisce over poster children and those who have shaped pop culture throughout the 20th century."

Charts

References

2022 singles
2022 songs
Red Hot Chili Peppers songs
Songs written by Anthony Kiedis
Songs written by Flea (musician)
Songs written by Chad Smith
Songs written by John Frusciante